Scirtidae is a family of beetles (Coleoptera). These beetles are commonly referred to as marsh beetles, as the larvae are typically associated with stagnant water, but can be found in flowing water. Adults prefer decomposing plant material near the water's edge. More than an estimated 600 species are known worldwide, distributed among at least 60 genera.

Genera 
These 81 genera belong to the family Scirtidae:

 Accolabass Watts, 2009
 Alpestriscyphon Watts, Cooper & Libonatti, 2020
 Amplectopus Sharp, 1886
 Anocyphon Watts, Cooper & Libonatti, 2020
 Anthocara Watts, Cooper & Libonatti, 2020
 Anticyphon Ruta, 2016
 Atopida White, 1846
 Austrocyphon Zwick, 2013
 Brachelodes Yablokov-Khnzorian, 1961
 Brachycyphon Fairmaire, 1896
 Byrrhopsis Champion, 1913
 Calvariopsis Ruta, 2019
 Calvarium Pic, 1918
 Chameloscyphon Watts, 2011
 Chilarboreus Ruta, 2011
 Contacyphon Des Gozis, 1886
 Copiacyphon Watts, Cooper & Libonatti, 2020
 Cygnocyphon Zwick, 2015
 Cyphanodes Broun, 1893
 Cyphanus Sharp, 1878
 Cyphon Paykull, 1799
 Cyphonogenius Yablokov-Khnzorian, 1961
 Cyphotelus Sharp, 1878
 Cyprobius Sharp, 1878
 Daploeuros Watts, 2011
 Dasyscyphon Watts, 2011
 Elodes Latreille, 1796
 Eurycyphon Watts, 2011
 Exneria Klausnitzer, 2013
 Exochomoscirtes Pic, 1916
 Furcacyphon Watts, Cooper & Libonatti, 2020
 Herthania Klausnitzer, 2006
 Heterocyphon Armstrong, 1953
 Hydrocyphon Redtenbacher, 1858
 Indiocyphon Pic, 1918
 Latuscara Watts, Cooper & Libonatti, 2020
 Leptocyphon Zwick, 2015
 Macrocyphon Pic, 1918
 Macrodascillus Carter, 1935
 Meatopida Kialka & Ruta, 2018
 Memorocyphon Pic, 1918
 Mescirtes Motschulsky, 1863
 Mesocyphon Sharp, 1878
 Microcara Thomson, 1859
 Miocyphon Wickham, 1914
 Nanocyphon Zwick, 2013
 Nasutuscyphon Watts, Cooper & Libonatti, 2020
 Nektriscyphon  Watts, Cooper & Libonatti, 2020
 Nipponocyphon Lawrence & Yoshitomi, 2007
 Nothocyphon Zwick, 2015
 Nyholmia Klausnitzer, 2013
 Odeles Klausnitzer, 2004
 Ora Clark, 1865 (flea marsh beetles)
 Papuacyphon Zwick, 2014
 Paracyphon Zwick, 2015
 Peneveronatus Armstrong, 1953
 Perplexacara Watts, Bradford & Cooper, 2021
 Petrocyphon Watts, 2011
 Pictacara Watts, Cooper & Libonatti, 2020
 Plagiocyphon Yablokov-Khnzorian, 1961
 Prionocyphon Redtenbacher, 1858
 Prionoscirtes Champion, 1897
 Pseudomicrocara Armstrong, 1953
 Pumiliocara Watts, Cooper & Libonatti, 2020
 Ruborcara Watts, Cooper & Libonatti, 2020
 Sacodes LeConte, 1853
 Saltuscyphon Watts, Cooper & Libonatti, 2020
 Saprocyphon Watts, Cooper & Libonatti, 2020
 Sarabandus Leech, 1955
 Scirtes Illiger, 1807
 Sisyracyphon Watts, Cooper & Libonatti, 2020
 Spaniosdascillus Watts, 2011
 Spilotocyphon Watts, Cooper & Libonatti, 2020
 Stenocyphon Lawrence, 2001
 Tasmanocyphon Zwick, 2013
 Tectocyphon Zwick, 2015
 Tenebriocyphon Watts, Cooper & Libonatti, 2020
 Vadumcyphon Watts, Cooper & Libonatti, 2020
 Veronatus Sharp, 1878
 Yoshitomia Klausnitzer, 2013
 Ypsiloncyphon Klausnitzer, 2009

Fossil genera 

 †Mesernobius Engel 2010 Burmese amber, Myanmar, Cenomanian
 †Miocyphon Wickham 1914 Florissant Formation, Colorado, Eocene

References

External links 

 
 

Scirtoidea
Polyphaga families